Live Fast Motorsports is an American professional stock car racing team that currently competes full-time in the NASCAR Cup Series. It is owned by B. J. McLeod, Matt Tifft, and Joe Falk. The team currently fields the No. 78 Chevrolet Camaro ZL1 for driver/owner McLeod and several other drivers, in a technical alliance with Richard Childress Racing.

History

Car No. 78 history

B. J. McLeod and ringers (2021–present)

On May 13, 2020, B. J. McLeod announced that his team, B. J. McLeod Motorsports, would be running part-time in the Cup Series with him as the driver. On October 23, 2020, it was announced that McLeod and Matt Tifft had teamed up with Joe Falk to acquire the charter from Go Fas Racing. Tifft was a former Cup Series driver who had to put his racing career on hold due to health issues in 2019. On November 20, 2020, the team announced its name, Live Fast Motorsports, and would continue to use the number 78. Although McLeod's primary manufacturer was Chevrolet in 2020, they were running Fords in the Cup Series. 

The No. 78 started the 2021 season with McLeod finishing 23rd at the 2021 Daytona 500. He scored the team's first top-10 with a ninth place finish at the Daytona night race. Scott Heckert drove the No. 78 at the Daytona road course (28th), Sonoma (26th), and the Charlotte Roval (31st). Dirt racer Shane Golobic drove the car to a 37th finish at the Bristol dirt race. British racer Kyle Tilley drove the No. 78 at COTA (31st), Road America (35th), and Watkins Glen (30th). Andy Lally finished 39th at the Indianapolis road course after Tilley was sidelined with a shoulder injury prior to the race. The No. 78 finished the season 32nd in points.

McLeod started the 2022 season with a 27th place finish at the 2022 Daytona 500. Lally finished 39th at COTA while Josh Williams finished 25th at the Bristol dirt race. Crew chief Lee Leslie was suspended for four races after McLeod lost a wheel during the Talladega race. Team engineer Christopher Stanley was announced as McLeod's crew chief for Dover. McLeod finished a career best seventh at the rain-delayed Daytona summer race. The No. 78 finished the season 36th in points.

On December 1, 2022, the team announced that it would be switching from Ford to Chevrolet for the 2023 NASCAR Cup Series season. On December 12, Josh Bilicki was announced to drive the No. 78 on a part-time schedule.

Car No. 78 results

References

External links
 
 

American auto racing teams
NASCAR teams
Companies based in North Carolina